Hatton railway station takes the name of the village of Hatton in Warwickshire, England, although it is about  from the village. It is situated in the linear settlement of the same name (Hatton Station), that evolved around the station, mainly in the 1950s and 1960s. Other close settlements are Little Shrewley and Shrewley. The station is managed by Chiltern Railways.

Hatton is the junction station at which the lines from Leamington Spa to Stratford-upon-Avon and Birmingham diverge. The station is unstaffed; ticketing is restricted to a 'Permit-to-Travel' machine located at the single entrance to the station on the London-bound (southbound) platform. There is a small shelter on Platform 1 (southbound - for trains from Birmingham to Leamington Spa) and also one on the island platform, which consists of Platforms 2 and 3 (Platform 2 is for Birmingham-bound services and Platform 3 is for stations from/to Stratford upon Avon, which bear to the west immediately north of the station. Trains can, however, use both Platforms 2 and 3 to reach Birmingham, as just outside the station, the lines re-join). A footbridge links Platform 1 with island Platform 2/3.

Each platform at the station is equipped with a real-time electronic information departure screen.

History

The station dates from 1852 (being opened by the Birmingham and Oxford Junction Railway), with the branch to Stratford opening in 1860 (this had a later extension, now closed, from Bearley Junction to  added in 1876).  It sits part way along a 5-mile (8 km) long rising section of line with a ruling gradient of 1 in 110 for northbound trains known as Hatton Bank - this section was often difficult to negotiate for heavy freights and the use of banking engines was commonplace.  The station had its platforms extended in 1892 and further remodelling of the track in the area would follow over the next two decades.  By 1939 the branch had been doubled, but the western end to Alcester was closed in 1951 and it reverted to single track in 1969, when signalling control was transferred to the newly commissioned panel box at Saltley.

Services

Off-peak, all services at Hatton are operated by Chiltern Railways. The current off-peak service is:
 1 train every 2 hours to 
 1 train every 2 hours to London Marylebone
 1 train every 2 hours to 
 1 train every 2 hours to 

These services combine to give an hourly service off-peak.

During the peak hours, the service is strengthened with Chiltern Trains between London and Birmingham making calls at the station. Additional services on the Snow Hill lines operated by West Midlands Railway also call here during the peak hours.

References

External links

Historical photographs of Hatton station at warwickshirerailways.com
Rail Around Birmingham and the West Midlands: Hatton station

Railway stations in Warwickshire
DfT Category F1 stations
Former Great Western Railway stations
Railway stations in Great Britain opened in 1852
Railway stations served by Chiltern Railways
Railway stations served by West Midlands Trains
1852 establishments in England